Refinery Row is the unofficial name given to the concentration of oil refineries in west Sherwood Park, Strathcona County, Alberta, just east of the city of Edmonton.

The area is roughly bounded on the south by the Sherwood Park Freeway (Highway 100), on the north by the North Saskatchewan River and Yellowhead Trail (Highway 16), on the east by Anthony Henday Drive (Highway 216), and on the west by 50 Street.  Other major roads that run through the area include: 34 Street, 17 Street NW, and 101 Avenue/Baseline Road.

The district is dominated by two refineries:
the Strathcona Refinery (Imperial Oil), can process  of crude oil per day; and
the Suncor Edmonton Refinery (Suncor Energy), which can process 

The other main refineries in the Edmonton area are also located in Strathcona County, in a separate concentration around Scotford, Alberta.

Refinery Row suffered F4 damage from the Edmonton Tornado on July 31, 1987.

See also 
Alberta's Industrial Heartland, aka "Upgrader Alley"
List of oil refineries (worldwide)

References 

Economy of Edmonton
Edmonton Metropolitan Region
Geography of Edmonton
Industrial parks in Canada
Lists of buildings and structures in Alberta
Oil refineries in Canada
Strathcona County